Albeniz may refer to:

People
Baltasar Albéniz (1905-1978), Spanish football manager
Isaac Albéniz (1860-1909), Spanish pianist and composer
Mateo Albéniz (1755-1831), Spanish composer and priest
Pedro Albéniz (1795–1855), Spanish pianist and composer

Other uses
Albéniz (film), a 1947 biographical film about Isaac Albéniz
10186 Albéniz, an asteroid named after Isaac Albéniz
Albéniz, Álava, a village in the Basque Country, Spain

See also
Albéniz Foundation, a private non-profit organization promoting classical music in Spain